Charles Amcotts  (1729–1777), was a British politician who sat in the House of Commons between  1754 and 1777.

Early life

Amcotts  was the son of Vincent Amcotts and his wife Elizabeth Quincey, daughter of John Quincey of Aslackby, Lincolnshire and was baptised 25 June 1729. He was admitted at Trinity Hall, Cambridge on  29 April 1746 but was expelled on 9 June 1749 for drinking the health of the Young Pretender. In 1763 he was created DCL at Oxford University. He inherited the Lincolnshire properties of Harrington Hall from his father and Kettlethorpe Hall from his father's step-brother and was picked High Sheriff of Lincolnshire for 1753–54.

Political career
In the 1754 general election Amcotts was returned unopposed as Member of Parliament for Boston. He considered sitting for Lincoln in 1761 but did not stand at either seat at the 1761 general election. He was returned unopposed as MP for Boston at a by-election of December 1766 and re-elected in the 1774 general election. Also in 1774 he was  alderman of Boston  and was sometime colonel of the Lincoln Militia. He was described as a notorious Jacobite and furious courtier, but is not recorded as having spoken in the house.

Later life
Amcotts died unmarried on 14 April 1777. Kettlethorpe passed to his sister Anna-Maria, the wife of Sir Wharton Emerson (who duly changed his name to Amcotts) and Harrington went to his sister Frances, the wife of Edward Buckworth.

References

1729 births
1777 deaths
Members of the Parliament of Great Britain for English constituencies
British MPs 1754–1761
British MPs 1761–1768
British MPs 1768–1774
British MPs 1774–1780
High Sheriffs of Lincolnshire